Thliptoceras fimbriata is a moth in the family Crambidae. It was described by Charles Swinhoe in 1900. It is found in northern China.

References

Moths described in 1900
Pyraustinae